Jacob J. Cuyler (September 1741 – June 5, 1804) was an American silversmith, active circa 1765-1790 in Albany, New York.

Early life
Cuyler was born in September 1741.  He was the son of Johannes Cuyler Jr. (1699–1746) and Catharina (née Glen) Cuyler (b. 1699).

His paternal grandparents were Albany mayor Johannes Cuyler (1661–1740) and Elsje Ten Broeck (d. 1752), herself the daughter of Albany mayor Dirck Wesselse Ten Broeck (1638–1717).  His mother was the daughter of Johannes Jacob Glen.

Career

He was a silversmith by trade and was known for his high quality work.  In Albany, he served as firemaster and was manager of the lottery during the early 1770s. In 1767, he  willed the estate of his uncle, Johannes Glen (1704-1770).

In 1766, he signed the constitution of Albany.  Cuyler was also a member of the Sons of Liberty, and in 1767 served as the first lieutenant in the Albany militia company.  During the Revolutionary War period, he was a member of the Albany Committee of Correspondence, and served as a delegate from Albany to the New York Provincial Congress in 1776, and later in the Continental Commissary General's office.

Personal life
On March 5, 1764, Cuyler married Lydia Van Vechten (1743–1808), the daughter of Dirck and Elizabeth (née Ten Broeck) Van Vechten, in Albany. By 1780, they had seven children.

Cuyler died on June 5, 1804.

References

External links
 Albany Institute of History & Art: 200 Years of Collecting, SUNY Press, page 184. .
 New York State Museum biography
 Rootsweb entry
 Founders Archives document, re salt pork

1741 births
1804 deaths
Artists from Albany, New York
American silversmiths
Members of the New York Provincial Congress